Pettet is a surname. Notable people with the surname include:

Brette Pettet (born 1999), Canadian ice hockey player
Darren Pettet (born 1975), Australian rugby league footballer
Isabella M. Pettet (1848–1912), American physician
Joanna Pettet (born 1942), British actress
William Varney Pettet (1858–1938), Canadian politician